Eylon Haim Almog (or Eilon, ; born ) is an Israeli professional footballer who plays as a Forward for Israeli Premier League club Maccabi Tel Aviv.

Early life
Almog was born and raised in Ness Ziona, Israel, to a Jewish family.

Club career
Almog started his senior career with Israeli Premier League club Maccabi Tel Aviv. After that, he played for Israeli side Beitar Tel Aviv Bat Yam. In 2019, he signed for Hapoel Hadera in the Israeli Premier League, where he made nineteen appearances and scored four goals.

Honours

Club
 Israeli Premier League (1): 2019-20
 Toto Cup (1): 2020-21
 Israel Super Cup (2): 2019, 2020

See also
List of Jewish footballers
List of Jews in sports
List of Israelis

References

External links

 Elon Almog: "I don't want to win a stellar championship"

1999 births
Israeli Jews
Living people
Israeli footballers
Jewish footballers
Maccabi Tel Aviv F.C. players
Beitar Tel Aviv Bat Yam F.C. players
Hapoel Hadera F.C. players
TSV Hartberg players
Israeli Premier League players
Liga Leumit players
Austrian Football Bundesliga players
Israeli expatriate footballers
Expatriate footballers in Austria
Israeli expatriate sportspeople in Austria
Footballers from Ness Ziona
Israel under-21 international footballers
Israel youth international footballers
Association football forwards